David Lekuta Rudisha, MBS (born 17 December 1988) is a Kenyan middle-distance runner who specialized in the 800 metres. He is a two-time back-to-back Olympic champion from the 2012 London and 2016 Rio Olympics, a two-time World champion from the 2011 and 2015 World Championships in Athletics, and world record holder at the event with a time of 1:40.91 set at the 2012 London Games on 9 August 2012. Rudisha is the first and only person to ever run 800 metres under 1:41, and he holds the three fastest, six of the eight fastest, and half of the twenty fastest times ever run in this event.

Rudisha established his running career at the St. Francis Kimuron High School in Elgeyo-Marakwet County. He won 800 m titles at the 2006 World Junior Championships as well as the 2008 and 2010 African Championships, and earned the 2014 Commonwealth Games silver medal. He also holds the world's best time in the 500 metres and the African best for the 600 metres. He is a two-time Diamond League 800 m winner. Rudisha has won IAAF World Athlete of the Year award in 2010 and three consecutive Track & Field News Athlete of the Year awards.

In May 2022, Rudisha announced he would be running for election in his native Kenya as an independent candidate in the Kilgoris Constituency.

Early life and background
Born on 17 December 1988 in Kilgoris, Narok County, Rudisha went to Kimuron Secondary School in Iten, Keiyo District. In April 2005, whilst under Brother Colm's tutelage, Japheth Kimutai, who was trained by Colm, recommended Rudisha to James Templeton, and Rudisha joined the group of runners managed by Templeton, which has at various time included Kimutai, Bernard Lagat and Augustine Choge. Initially he was the 400 metres runner, but his coach, Irishman Colm O'Connell, prompted him to try the 800 metres. In 2006, he became the world junior champion over that distance.

Career
Rudisha competed at the 2009 World Athletics Championships, reaching the 800 metres semi-finals. In September 2009, he won the IAAF Grand Prix meeting in Rieti, Italy, posting a new African record of 1:42.01, beating the 25-year-old record of 1:42.28 set by compatriot Sammy Koskei. That effort put him in fourth place on the all-time list.

2010

In the 2010 Diamond League, he took on Abubaker Kaki at the Bislett Games in June. He defeated Sebastian Coe's 31-year-old meet record with a run of 1:42.04, giving him another place in the top-ten fastest ever 800 m and leaving Kaki the consolation of the fastest ever non-winning time. On 10 July, Rudisha ran the 800 m in 1:41.51 at the KBC Night of Athletics in Heusden, Belgium; this new personal record placed him No. 2 all-time in the world for the 800 m.

On 22 August, Rudisha broke Wilson Kipketer's 800 m world record two days before the anniversary of that record with a time of 1:41.09 while racing in the ISTAF Berlin meeting in Germany. Just a week later, he broke the record again at the IAAF World Challenge meeting in Rieti, lowering it to 1:41.01. Rudisha recorded four victories on the Diamond League circuit that year to take his first 800 m Diamond Trophy. In November, at the age of 21, he became the youngest ever athlete to win the IAAF World Athlete of the Year award. He was also crowned Kenyan Sportsman of the Year.

2011
Rudisha claimed his first senior global title at the 2011 World Championships in Athletics held in Daegu, South Korea, winning 800 m event with a time 1:43.91. He triumphed also in three Diamond League races that season to secure his second consecutive overall 800 m Diamond Race title.

2012
With a time of 1:41.74, Rudisha set the United States all comers 800 m record at the 2012 adidas Grand Prix at Icahn Stadium in New York City. He guaranteed his selection for the Kenyan Olympic team for the first time with a win at the Kenyan trials, running a time of 1:42.12 minutes—the fastest ever recorded at altitude.

2012 Summer Olympics

On 9 August 2012 at the 2012 Summer Olympics in London, Rudisha led from start to finish to win gold in what was acclaimed "The Greatest 800 Meter Race Ever". In so doing, he became the first and, so far, only runner to break the 1:41 barrier for 800 m. From the start of the final race, Rudisha led and pulled away from the rest of the field after 200 metres, completing the first lap in 49.28 seconds. By 600 metres his lead had grown to several metres. He continued to pull away until the final straight, where second place Nijel Amos was able to slightly gain some ground as Rudisha strained. But the gap was much too great to close, and Rudisha crossed the line in a world-record time of 1:40.91.

Rudisha's competitors all ran exceptional times. Sports Illustrateds David Epstein reported that the race "is best told, perhaps, in 16 letters: WR, NR, PB, PB, PB, NR, SB, PB." (That is to say that the participants broke world record, national record, personal bests, national record, season best, personal best) The silver medallist, Amos, had to be carried from the track on a stretcher after setting the world junior record, making him only the fifth man in history to run under 1:42, something Rudisha has now done seven times. "With Rudisha breaking 1:41, two men under 1:42, five under 1:43 and all eight under 1:44," noted the IAAF, "it was the greatest depth 800 m race in history." Every competitor ran the fastest time in history for their placing. It was the first time in international 800 m history where every competitor ran either a personal or season's best. The time set by the eighth-placed Andrew Osagie, a personal best of 1:43.77, would have won gold at the three preceding Olympic games in Beijing, Athens and Sydney.

As well as being the first man to go below 1:41, he broke his own world record that was set in 2010. "The splits triggered amazement: 23.4 secs for the first 200 m, 25.88 secs for the second, a critical 25.02 for the third and 26.61 to bring it all home." Rudisha's record was considered especially notable for the absence of pacemakers, which are not permitted at the Olympics or other major championships. The previous person to win an Olympic 800 m final with a world record was Alberto Juantorena, back in 1976. Rudisha also became the first reigning 800 m world champion to win Olympic gold at that distance. Sebastian Coe, of the London Olympics organising committee who himself held the 800 m world record for 17 years, said: "It was the performance of the Games, not just of track and field but of the Games". He added: "Bolt was good, Rudisha was magnificent. That is quite a big call but it was the most extraordinary piece of running I have probably ever seen." Rudisha had been in good shape coming into the race, having "clocked a staggering 1:42.12 minutes at high altitude in Nairobi during the Kenyan Olympic trials. After that he had said 'the race was nice and easy'."

Before the race, Rudisha had joked about his father's 1968 400 m relay silver medal: "It would be good for me to win gold, so we can have gold and silver in our family [...] so I can tell him, 'I am better than you. Afterwards, he admitted that it would go down as the greatest 800 m race personally for him as well because he won it in front of Sebastian Coe who held the record for more than 17 years. This race was also touted as a run for his community and tribe. Rudisha was later given the Association of National Olympic Committees Award for Best Male Athlete of London 2012, as well as receiving the honour of Moran of the Order of the Burning Spear (MBS) from the government of Kenya.

2013
He could not compete at the 2013 World Championships in Athletics because of an injury.

2015

At the New York IAAF Diamond League meeting in June 2015, Rudisha won the 800 m with a time of 1:43.58.

Rudisha claimed his second world 800 m title at the World Championships held in Beijing, China. In a relatively tactical race, after a first lap of only 54.17 he won in a time of 1:45.84

2016
Rudisha successfully defended his Olympic title at the 2016 Rio Summer Olympics, taking gold with a time of 1:42.15. He was the first person since Peter Snell in 1964 to win back-to-back Olympic 800 m titles. The final went out very quickly with fellow Kenyan Alfred Kipketer leading through 200 m in 23.2 sec. Rudisha was tucked in close behind through a 49.3 first 400 m. With just under 300 m to go Rudisha made a strong surge to the front. A large gap was formed that proved too much for fast closing Taoufik Makhloufi of Algeria in the final homestretch. His finishing time was the fastest he has run since the 2012 Olympic final in London, as well as the fastest time in the world for 2016.

2017
Rudisha finished fourth at the Shanghai Diamond League meet. His time was 1:45.36. The winning time was 1:44.70. He attempted the 1000 metres for the first time at the Golden Spike Ostrava, finishing fourth with a personal best time of 2:19.43.

Coaching
At the 2012 Olympics, Rudisha worked with Caroline Currid, an Irish mental performance coach, on how to maximise performance on competition day.

From 2007 until at least 2012, Rudisha trained in the summer months in the university town of Tübingen in southern Germany, a center for many up-and-coming runners from Kenya such as Bernard Lagat.

Personal life
Rudisha is a member of the Maasai ethnic group in Kenya. His father, Daniel Rudisha, was a former runner who won the silver medal at the 1968 Olympics as part of the Kenyan 4 × 400 m relay team, while his mother Naomi is a former 400 m hurdler. He is married to Lizzy Naanyu and has two daughters (as of 2015). Tom Fordyce of the BBC said of him, "He is the greatest 800m runner of all time and he may also be the nicest man in his sport."

He is a supporter of the football club Arsenal F.C.

Transport disasters
In 2019, Rudisha's car collided head-on with a bus near Keroka. The collision was frontal, but the athlete was not seriously injured.

In December 2022, he became one of five people who survived a plane crash-landing in Kenya.

Achievements

International competitions

Circuit wins and titles
 Diamond League 800 m overall winner:  2010,  2011
 800 metres wins, other events specified in parenthesis
 2010 (4): Doha Qatar Athletic Super Grand Prix, Oslo Bislett Games (WL MR), Lausanne Athletissima, Brussels Memorial Van Damme
 2011 (4): Lausanne, Monaco Herculis (WL), London Grand Prix (promotional events), Brussels
 2012 (3): Doha, New York Adidas Grand Prix (WL MR), Paris Meeting Areva
 2013 (2): Doha Qatar Athletic (WL), New York
 2014 (3): New York, Glasgow Grand Prix (=WL), Birmingham British Athletics Grand Prix (600m)
 2015 (1): New York
 2016 (1): Birmingham (600m, WL MR ')

References

External links

 
 David Rudisha All-Athletics profile 

1988 births
Living people
People from Narok County
Kenyan male middle-distance runners
Olympic male middle-distance runners
Olympic athletes of Kenya
Olympic gold medalists for Kenya
Olympic gold medalists in athletics (track and field)
Athletes (track and field) at the 2012 Summer Olympics
Athletes (track and field) at the 2016 Summer Olympics
Medalists at the 2012 Summer Olympics
Medalists at the 2016 Summer Olympics
Commonwealth Games medallists in athletics
Commonwealth Games silver medallists for Kenya
Athletes (track and field) at the 2014 Commonwealth Games
World Athletics Championships athletes for Kenya
World Athletics Championships medalists
World Athletics record holders
Maasai people
Track & Field News Athlete of the Year winners
Diamond League winners
IAAF Continental Cup winners
World Athletics Championships winners
IAAF World Athletics Final winners
Medallists at the 2014 Commonwealth Games